"Walls Come Down" is a song co-written and recorded by Canadian country artist Meghan Patrick. The song was co-written with Kelly Archer and Justin Weaver. It was the third single from Patrick's second studio album Country Music Made Me Do It, and her first #1 hit on the Billboard Canada Country chart.

Commercial performance
"Walls Come Down" reached a peak of #1 on the Billboard Canada Country chart for the week of December 22, 2018, marking her first number one hit. Prior to the song hitting Number One, Patrick received an outpouring of support from artists in the Canadian country music community including Brett Kissel, Paul Brandt, and the Washboard Union, as they were eager to see Patrick claim her first chart-topper, and see the song join Lindsay Ell's "Criminal" as the first pair of songs from Canadian female artists to hit number one in the same year since 1999. Patrick was also the seventh different Canadian artist to hit number one on Canadian country radio in 2018, an all-time record since Nielsen began tracking in 1995.

Music video
The official music video for "Walls Come Down"  stars Meghan Patrick and actress Tracy Déchaux. It was directed by Stephano Barberis and premiered on September 9, 2018.

Charts

References

2018 songs
2018 singles
Meghan Patrick songs
Warner Music Group singles 
Songs written by Meghan Patrick
Songs written by Kelly Archer
Songs written by Justin Weaver
Song recordings produced by Jeremy Stover
Music videos directed by Stephano Barberis